KOZI (1230 kHz) is an AM radio station  broadcasting a news/talk format. Licensed to Chelan, Washington, United States, the station is currently owned by Chelan Valley Media Group.

References

External links

OZI
Radio stations established in 1972